Toward the Blues is a studio album by the Australian blues band Chain which reached No. 6 on the Kent Music Report albums chart. In October 2010, it was listed in the book, 100 Best Australian Albums.

The 30th anniversary edition (September 2001) of the album added an 's' to the word Toward of the album title, Towards the Blues.

Track listing
All songs written by Phil Manning, Barry Harvey, Barry Sullivan and Matt Taylor; except where noted.
 "Black and Blue" (single version)
 "Judgement"
 "Slow in D"
 "Thirty Two Twenty Blues" (Robert Johnson, Traditional arranged by Chain)
 "Snatch It Back and Hold It" (Junior Wells)
 "Boogie"
 "Booze Is Bad News Blues"
 "Albert Gooses Gonna Turn the Blues Looses"
 "Black and Blue" (original album version)

Charts

Certifications

References

1971 albums
Chain (band) albums
Infinity Records albums